RC Tatra Smíchov is a Czech rugby club in Smíchov, Prague.

They currently play in the KB Extraliga.

History
The club was founded in 1958.

Honours
 Czechoslovak Cup
 1980, 1981, 1983
 Czech Cup
 1995, 1997
 KB Extraliga
 1995, 1997, 2003, 2007, 2008

Historical names

 1958 - 1993 TJ Tatra Smíchov ČKD (Tělovýchovná jednota Tatra Smíchov Českomoravská Kolben-Daněk)
 1994 -           RC Tatra Smíchov

External links
  RC Tatra Smíchov

Czech rugby union teams
Sport in Prague
Rugby clubs established in 1958